Beadboard may refer to:

 A rigid panel made from molded expanded polystyrene foam (MEPS/EPS)
 A type of panelling made from tongue-and-groove boards